Foluso Taiwo was an Anglican bishop in Nigeria:  he was Bishop of Oke-Osun until his death in November 2020.

Notes

21st-century Anglican bishops in Nigeria
Year of birth missing
Anglican bishops of Oke-Osun
2020 deaths